INS Ranvir (Hero of the Battlefield) is the fourth of the five s built for the Indian Navy. Ranvir was commissioned on 28 October 1986.

Service history

2008 

2015 
On 22–26 May 2015, INS Ranvir with  visited Singapore. On 31 May - 4 June 2015, INS Ranvir with INS Shakti made a port call at Jakarta, Indonesia. She was commanded by Captain Jaswinder Singh.

2022 
On 18 January 2022, there was an explosion in an internal compartment of the ship at the naval dockyard in Mumbai, resulting in three deaths and eleven injuries. Minor structural damage was also reported. 
 The blast was attributed to Freon gas leak in the AC compartment. Krishan Kumar MCPO I, Surinder Kumar MCPO II and A.K. Singh MCPO II were killed in the incident.

References

External links

Rajput (Kashin II class) at Bharat Rakshak.

Rajput-class destroyers
Ships built in the Soviet Union
1983 ships
Destroyers of India
Destroyers of the Cold War